Güzelyurt is a neighbourhood in the Palandöken District of Erzurum Province in Turkey.

References

Villages in Palandöken District